The 22111 / 12 Dadadham Intercity Express is an Express  train belonging to Indian Railways Central Railway zone that runs between  and  in India.

Coaches
The 22111 / 12 Dadadham Intercity Express has one AC Chair car, two Chair cars, six general unreserved, and two SLR (seating with luggage rake) coaches. It does not carry a pantry car coach. As is customary with most train services in India, coach composition may be amended at the discretion of Indian Railways depending on demand.

Service

Routing

Traction
As the route is electrified, a  based WAP-4 electric locomotive pulls the train to its destination.

References

External links
22111 Dadadham Intercity Express at India Rail Info
22112 Dadadham Intercity Express at India Rail Info

Intercity Express (Indian Railways) trains
Transport in Bhusawal
Rail transport in Maharashtra
Rail transport in Madhya Pradesh
Transport in Nagpur